The Montréal Carabins are the men's and women's athletic teams that represent the Université de Montréal in Montreal, Quebec, Canada. Teams play at the CEPSUM Stadium and at l'aréna du CEPSUM, located at the Université de Montréal campus.

History of the club

Alpine ski

Badminton

Cheerleading 

The Carabins cheerleading team was created in 2002 at the same time as the rebirth of the Carabins football team. The team has hosted Super Bowl parties in order to finance its activities.

Football 

The Carabins football program was originally in operation from 1966 to 1971, but was cut following a philosophical change with intercollegiate athletics among Quebec universities at the time. As that perception changed, the football team was reinstated in 2002 and has been in continuous operation since. The team has won four Dunsmore Cup conference championships (2014, 2015, 2019, and 2021) and one Vanier Cup national championship (2014).

Golf

Women's ice hockey

The 2009-10 season was their inaugural season in the CIS. The Carabins finished second during the regular season and claimed the fifth position in the CIS Canadian championships. In their second season (2010–11), the team ranked in second place in the Québécois conference behind the McGill Martlets. In the 2011 playoffs, the Carabins eliminated the Concordia Stingers  but the Carabins are in turn to eliminate in finale by McGill. This elimination did not qualify them for the CIS championships at Waterloo, Ontario.

Men's rugby 
Since their inaugural season in 2012, the Carabins men's rugby program competes at a varsity level against universities from Québec and Eastern Ontario in the RSEQ and has won one RSEQ championship (2016).

Women's rugby 
Since their inaugural season in 2012, the Carabins women's rugby program competes at a varsity level against universities from Québec and Eastern Ontario in the RSEQ conference of U Sports.

Men's soccer

Staff 2012-13
 Head Coach: Pat Raimondo
 Assistant Coach: Abdoulaye Mané
 Goalkeeper Coach: Daniel Courtois
 Assistant Coach: Boubacar Coulibaly

Notable former players

 Serge Topalian

 Gerardo Argento
 Marc-André Bonenfant
 Lorenzo Borella
 Guillaume Couturier
 Maël Demarcy
 Laurent Parizeau
 Jean-Philippe Roberge-Marin
 Ibrahim Baldeh
 Christian Nuñez

 Hugo-Pierre Marcotte

 Abel Moleka

 Julien Cohen-Arazi
 Gabriel de Foresta
 Augustin Nechad
 Jean-Jacques Seba
 Ugo Robard
 Wandrille Lefèvre

 Boubacar Diallo

 Woodler Elie Blaise
 Peter Thierry Eustache

 Pascal Aoun
 Anasse Brouk

 Herizo Frédéric Ramampiandra

 Kévin Chan

 Hicham Aaboubou

  Alhassane Fox
  Kane Limamoulaye
 Oumar Balla Sow

 Nicolas Suter

 Nawar Hanna

 Sami Sreis

Notable former staff members
 Sergio Grande (Goalkeeper coach)

Women's soccer

Squad 2010-11

Staff 2010-11
 Head Coach: Kevin McConnell
 Assistant Coach: Nadine Hudon-Paquette
 Goalkeeper Coach: Salim Brahimi

Notable former players

 Sandra Couture - 2002-2006
 Véronique Maranda - 2007-2009
 Émilie Mercier - 2005-2009
  Véronique Laverdière - 2006-2011

Swimming

Tennis

Men's volleyball

Women's volleyball

See also
 U Sports

References

External links
 Carabins official site
 Centre d'éducation physique et des sports de l'Université de Montréal (CEPSUM)

 
Carabins
Carabins
Carabins
U Sports teams in Quebec